Mohamud Ali Magan is a Somali politician. He was the Minister of Planning of Somalia, having been appointed to the position on 12 January 2015 by Prime Minister Omar Abdirashid Ali Sharmarke, and in March 2017 succeeded by Jamal Mohamed Hassan in the cabinet of Prime Minister Hassan Ali Khaire.

References

Living people
Government ministers of Somalia
Year of birth missing (living people)